Stage 11 of the 2010 Tour de France occurs on 15 July in Sisteron, and the race concludes on 25 July with its traditional Champs-Élysées stage.

Stage 11
15 July 2010 — Sisteron to Bourg-lès-Valence, 

This is classified as a flat stage, visiting the third-category Col de la Cabre after  and then descending most of the way to the finish. The stage got off to a normal start with a three-man breakaway forming just after passing through kilometer zero. Now it was time for the sprinters, but  took control of the peloton and pushed the tempo up to 62 km/h. Then the sprinters' teams came to the front and started the dash to the line. Mark Renshaw led out Mark Cavendish for the thirteenth Tour de France stage win of his career. In a controversial decision Renshaw was disqualified and forced to abandon the Tour for head butting Julian Dean during the sprint and for moving into Tyler Farrar's line.

Stage 12
16 July 2010 — Bourg-de-Péage to Mende, 

This stage is hilly, with two second-category and three third-category climbs. The Col de la Croix Neuve comes  from the finish, followed by a brief flat section. The peloton remained intact up until the second categorized climb of the day, before a group of eighteen riders dashed away from the peloton. Hushovd regained the lead in the points classification after winning the second intermediate sprint of the day. With about 48 km to go in the stage Klöden, Vinokourov, 's Ryder Hesjedal, and Vasil Kiryienka of  jumped off the front of the breakaway. The group would stay intact until the final climb of the day where Vinokourov would attack on the climb. While on the climb Alberto Contador attacked, which caught Andy Schleck off guard. Joaquim Rodríguez followed Contador, who quickly caught up to the leading Vinokourov. Contador and Rodriguez would go to the finish together, with Rodriguez outsprinting Contador for the stage win. Contador gained ten seconds on Schleck.

Stage 13
17 July 2010 — Rodez to Revel, 

This is classified as a flat stage, though it incorporates five climbs, two in the third category and three in the fourth.

Stage 14
18 July 2010 — Revel to Ax 3 Domaines, 

The first of several difficult stages in the Pyrenees in the Tour's last week visits the French Basque Country. The hors catégorie Port de Pailhères precedes the first-category summit finish at Ax-3-Domaines.

Stage 15
19 July 2010 — Pamiers to Bagnères-de-Luchon, 

This stage also includes an hors catégorie climb, Port de Balès. The finish comes on a steep,  descent from the climb.

In Stage 15, controversy arose when Alberto Contador took advantage of a mechanical problem that Andy Schleck had at a pivotal moment to take the yellow jersey, as it is considered good sportsmanship to wait for the yellow jersey when he has technical trouble. Contador explained that he did not know that Schleck had technical trouble, and that he had already launched an attack by then. Hours later, he apologised for the incident. Although he was loudly booed by sections of the crowd when he received the yellow jersey on the podium and was criticised by Sean Kelly and a number of riders both past and current, he also found support from the likes of Bernard Hinault, Miguel Induráin, Eddy Merckx and Laurent Jalabert.  Schleck himself said that he and Contador discussed the matter during the next stage and that the matter has been resolved.

Stage 16
20 July 2010 — Bagnères-de-Luchon to Pau, 

This stage has four difficult climbs, starting with the first-category Col de Peyresourde and Col d'Aspin within the first . The next climb is the Col du Tourmalet, the first of two times the climb is visited in this Tour, and later comes the Col d'Aubisque. Both the Tourmalet and the Aubisque are hors catégorie climbs.

Stage 17
22 July 2010 — Pau to Col du Tourmalet, 

The Tour's second rest day occurs in Pau, meaning the Tour will have been in the same town for three straight days. This has been called the Tour's queen stage, and features the second ascent of the Tourmalet, coming as a steep summit finish. The first-category Col de Marie-Blanque and Col du Soulor climbs precede it. Anthony Charteau provisionally sealed the Polka-dot Jersey, as neither he nor Christophe Moreau accumulated any points during this stage, which featured the final categorized climbs of this year's Tour. The stage itself turned into a thrilling battle between Andy Schleck and Alberto Contador. With Schleck needing to make up lost time on Contador, he launched numerous attacks in the final 15 kilometres. However, surrounded by his fans, Contador fought to stay on the wheel of Schleck. Late on, Contador attacked himself but was pulled back. Schleck went on to take the stage, but Contador, who was happy to follow Schleck and did not sprint, had a seemingly unassailable lead.

Stage 18
23 July 2010 — Salies-de-Béarn to Bordeaux, 

This was a flat stage.

Stage 19
24 July 2010 — Bordeaux to Pauillac,  (individual time trial)

The race returns to its tradition of having a time trial on its penultimate day. The course is long, straight, and flat. Race officials expect the average time to complete the course will be 64 minutes. Fabian Cancellara took his second victory of the tour, whilst Tony Martin finished second. The battle between Alberto Contador and Andy Schleck for the yellow jersey also reached its climax. With Contador being the more accomplished Time-Trialist, he was expected to increase his lead. However, at the first time check, Schleck had taken time out of him and the lead was down to two seconds. However, from there on in, Contador began to open a gap, and ended picking time up 31 seconds on Schleck, meaning his Yellow Jersey was now safe.

Stage 20
25 July 2010 — Longjumeau to Paris, 

The Tour concluded with its traditional, largely ceremonial finale on the Champs-Élysées. The riders take eight laps of the famous avenue before the final podium presentations. Mark Cavendish sprinted clear in the final 300 yards, with Alessandro Petacchi riding into second and Julian Dean third

References

2010 Tour de France
Tour de France stages